AD 75 (LXXV) was a common year starting on Sunday (link will display the full calendar) of the Julian calendar. At the time, it was known as the Year of the Consulship of Augustus and Vespasianus (or, less frequently, year 828 Ab urbe condita). The denomination AD 75 for this year has been used since the early medieval period, when the Anno Domini calendar era became the prevalent method in Europe for naming years.

Events

By place

Roman Empire 
 Emperor Vespasian and his son Titus Caesar Vespasianus become Roman Consuls.
 The Temple of Peace, also known as the Forum of Vespasian, is built in Rome. The temple celebrates the conquest of Jerusalem (in AD 70) and houses the Menorah from Herod's Temple.  
 Vespasian fortifies Armazi (Georgia) for the Iberian king Mithridates I. The Alans raid the Roman frontier in Armenia. 
 Sextus Julius Frontinus becomes governor of Britannia and makes his headquarters in Isca Augusta (Wales).    
 Frontinus begins his conquest of Wales; Legio II Augusta is moved to the border of the River Usk.

Asia 
 Accession of Han Zhangdi of the Han Dynasty (until AD 88).
 Revolt against the Chinese in Tarim: Cachera and Turpan are besieged. Luoyang orders the evacuation of Tarim. Ban Chao makes the rebels retreat towards Khotan. At the same time, the Chinese army of Ganzhou reconquers Turpan in Northern Xiongnu. Ban Chao convinces the emperor of the need to control Central Asia in the fight against Xiongnu.

Births 
 Suetonius, Roman historian (approximate date) (d. c. 122)
 Gaius Julius Alexander Berenicianus, Cilician prince (d. 150)

Deaths 
 Chen Mu, Chinese governor and general
 Guo Xun, Chinese general
 Han Mingdi, Chinese emperor of the Han Dynasty (b. AD 28)

References 

0075

als:70er#Johr 75